Inside is a studio album by David Sanborn, released through Elektra Records in 1999. In 2000, the album won Sanborn the Grammy Award for Best Contemporary Jazz Performance.

Track listing 

 "Corners (For Herbie)" (Marcus Miller) - 4:50
 "Day Dreaming" (Aretha Franklin) - 5:36; featuring Cassandra Wilson
 "Trance" (Miller) - 5:02
 "Brother Ray" (Miller) - 5:57
 "Lisa" (David Sanborn) - 4:33
 "When I'm With You" (Miller) - 4:58; featuring Eric Benét and Lalah Hathaway
 "Naked Moon" (Miller) - 5:41
 "Cane" (Meshell Ndegeocello) - 0:46
 "Ain't No Sunshine" (Bill Withers) - 4:12; featuring Sting
 "Miss You" (Sanborn) - 5:56

Personnel 
 David Sanborn – alto saxophone 
 Marcus Miller – keyboards, Rhodes piano, guitars, bass, drums, clarinet, backing vocals (6), arrangements (6)
 Ricky Peterson – Hammond B3 organ (4)
 Gil Goldstein – electric piano (10), arrangements (10)
 Davis Isaac – keyboards (10)
 Marvin Sewell – National resaphonic guitar (2, 7)
 Dean Brown – guitars (5)
 Bill Frisell – guitars (9)
 Fareed Haque – acoustic guitar (9)
 Derek Trucks – slide guitar (4)
 Gene Lake – drums (4, 6, 10)
 Don Alias – percussion (1-7, 9)
 Michael Brecker – tenor saxophone (1, 4)
 Ronnie Cuber – baritone saxophone (4)
 Lenny Pickett – tenor saxophone (4)
 Wallace Roney – trumpet (4)
 Hank Roberts – cello (9)
 Cassandra Wilson – lead vocals (2)
 Eric Benét – backing vocals (2), lead and backing vocals (6)
 Lalah Hathaway – lead and backing vocals (6)
 Sting – lead vocals (9)

Production 
 Marcus Miller – producer, engineer 
 Davis Isaac – co-producer, engineer
 Goh Hotada – engineer, mixing 
 Paul Mitchell – engineer
 Malcolm Pollack – engineer
 Dean Sharenow – engineer 
 Takamasa Hondu – assistant engineer 
 John R. Reigert III – assistant engineer 
 Rory Romano – assistant engineer 
 Mike Tocci – assistant engineer 
 Zach Wind – assistant engineer 
 Greg Calbi – mastering 
 Bibi Green – production coordinator 
 Jennifer Roddie – art direction, design  
 Michael Wilson – cover photography
 Eric Johnson – photography

Studios 
 Recorded at Camel Island (New Jersey); Avatar Studios, Hiatus Studios, Sound On Sound and Electric Lady Studios (New York City, New York).
 Mixed at Sound On Sound and Electric Lady Studios.
 Mastered at Sterling Sound (New York City, New York).

References

1999 albums
David Sanborn albums
Albums produced by Marcus Miller
Elektra Records albums
Grammy Award for Best Contemporary Jazz Album